The grove snail, brown-lipped snail or Lemon snail (Cepaea nemoralis) is a species of air-breathing land snail, a terrestrial pulmonate gastropod mollusc. 

It is one of the most common species of land snail in Europe, and has been introduced to North America.

Subspecies
 Cepaea nemoralis etrusca (Rossmässler, 1835)
 Cepaea nemoralis nemoralis (Linnaeus, 1758)

Cepaea nemoralis is the type species of the genus Cepaea. It is used as a model organism in citizen science projects.

Description

Cepaea nemoralis is among the largest and, because of its polymorphism and bright colours, one of the best-known snails in Western Europe. The colour of the shell of Cepaea nemoralis is very variable; it can be reddish, brownish, yellow or whitish, with or without one or more dark-brown colour bands. Names for every colour variant were established in the 1800s; but this system was later abandoned.

The thickened and slightly out-turned apertural lip usually dark brown, rarely white. The umbilicus is narrow but open in juveniles, and closed in adults. The surface of the shell is semi-glossy, and it has from 4½ to 5½ whorls. The width of the shell is 18–25 mm. The height of the shell is 12–22 mm.

Identification

The similar species Caucasotachea vindobonensis is less intensely coloured. The grove snail is closely related to the white-lipped snail, C. hortensis, shares much the same habitat, and has similar shell colour and pattern. The grove snail is usually the larger of the two species when mature, but the principal difference is that the adult grove snail almost always has a dark brown lip to its shell, whilst adults of Cepaea hortensis almost always have a white lip. However, a morph of the grove snail also has a white lip. In areas where lip colour is variable, dissection is necessary: the structure of the love dart is quite different in the two species, as are the vaginal mucus glands. A cross-section of the love dart shows a cross with simple blades, whereas that of C. hortensis has bifurcated blades. C. hortensis has 4 or more branches of body light with reddish or brownish hue, upper side often slightly darker, tentacles darker and 15 mm long.

Coloration

Apart from the band at the lip of the shell, lemon snails are highly polymorphic in their shell colour and banding. The background colour of the shell can sometimes be so pale as to be almost white; it can also be yellow, pink, chestnut through to dark brown, and the shells can be with or without dark bandings. The bands vary in intensity of colour, in width and in total number, from zero up to a total of six.

The polymorphism has been intensely studied from 1940 onwards for its heredity, evolution and ecology. Researchers have variously asserted that the cause is random genetic drift, different natural selection pressures in different areas (the snail often has darker camouflage in woodland, lighter in rough grassland) with mixing by migration, and balanced polymorphism. Balanced polymorphism could arise when a predator like the song thrush has a given 'search image', so it tends to see and kill snails of a particular colour and pattern. Natural selection would then favour a diversity of colours and patterns as an antipredator adaptation. However it appears that no one explanation is the whole answer: most probably, the polymorphism has several causes, including selection of paler, more reflective colours in hot environments to reduce water loss.

Different coloration and banding of the shells of Cepaea nemoralis:

Distribution

The native distribution of this species is from northern and western Europe to central Europe, including Ireland and Great Britain. The species is rare and scattered in northern Scotland, where it has been introduced. It is not found in the Hebrides, Orkney or Shetland. It seems to have been affected by air pollution and soil acidification in some parts of England.

The species is found in France, Netherlands, Switzerland, Austria, Germany, eastwards to northwestern Poland, Czech Republic, SW Hungary, southern Portugal, central Spain, Bosnia, in Italy to Lucania, and as far north as southern Sweden. In Eastern Europe it is found in Latvia, Kaliningrad, Estonia (Hiiumaa island), and Ukraine.

No doubt aided by human transport, this species is a good colonizer, and is often found in gardens, parks and abandoned land in cities. In Eastern Europe it occurs in urban areas. More recently, the grove snail has been introduced to North America, and Venezuela. It has been reported in British Columbia and Northern Ontario, Canada as well as in western Washington State.

The white-lipped snail has a similar range, but that species extends further north, to border the Arctic.

Biology and ecology

This is a very common and widespread species in Western Europe, occupying a very wide range of habitats from dunes along the coastline, to woodlands with full canopy cover. It lives in shrubs and open woods, in plains and highlands, dunes, cultivated habitats, gardens and roadsides. It can be found up to an altitude of 1200 m in the Alps, 1800 m in the Pyrenees, 900 m in Wales, 600 m in Scotland.

This species feeds mainly on dead or senescent plants. It is not noxious to crops.

Like most pulmonate land snails, it is hermaphrodite and must mate to produce fertile eggs. Mating tends to be concentrated in late spring and early summer, though it can continue through the autumn. The snails often store the sperm they receive from their partner for some time, and individual broods can have mixed paternity. In Britain it lays clutches of 30–50 (in France 40–80) oval eggs between June and August (in France May–October, in W France until November). The size of the egg is 3.1 × 2.6 mm or egg diameter can be 2.3–3.0 mm. Juveniles hatch after 15–20 days. Maturity is reached when the shell reaches full adult form, which in France is after one year.

This snail is comparatively slow-growing, usually taking three years to develop from an egg to a breeding adult. The life-span for this species is up to seven or eight years, with annual survival rates of about 50% (= 3% in five years, older adults suffer higher mortalities). In winter, the snails may hibernate, but can become active again during warm spells.

Cepaea nemoralis is known experimentally to be a host for Angiostrongylus vasorum. Predators of Cepaea nemoralis include the song thrush (Turdus philomelos).

References
This article includes public domain text from the reference and CC-BY-2.5 text from the reference

External links

 Cepaea nemoralis at Animalbase taxonomy,short description, distribution, biology,status (threats), images 
Cepaea nemoralis images at Encyclopedia of Life
 Evolution MegaLab was an online survey of Cepaea polymorphism (no longer online) 
 Life & Environment, University of the West of Scotland

Helicidae
Gastropods described in 1758
Molluscs of Europe
Taxa named by Carl Linnaeus